Nebulus is a platform game created by John M. Phillips and published by Hewson Consultants in the late 1980s for home computer systems. International releases and ports were known by various other names: Castelian, Subline, and Tower Toppler.

The game's original 8-bit release received some critical acclaim, in particular the Commodore 64 release, which garnered a Gold Medal award from UK magazine Zzap!64.

Nebulus was followed by the lesser-known Nebulus 2 for the Amiga in the 1990s.

Gameplay 

Nebulus is a platform game. The player character, a green creature called Pogo, is on a mission to destroy eight towers that have been built in the sea by planting bombs at the towers' peaks.

The actual gameplay happens at each tower in turn. Pogo starts from the bottom and finds the way to the top. The towers are cylinder-shaped and have ledges on their outside, either horizontal, forming stairs or connected by elevators. A notable feature of the game is that when Pogo walks left or right the tower behind him turns clockwise or counterclockwise with a convincing sense of depth. This was noted favourably in reviews of the game.

During the ascent, Pogo encounters many different enemies, mostly shaped like basic geometric shapes. Pogo can shoot some of the enemies, while some are impervious to shooting. Contact with an enemy knocks Pogo down to the ledge below. If there is no ledge below, Pogo falls into the sea and drowns.

At the top of the tower, Pogo enters a door to trigger the tower's destruction mechanism. Pogo then boards his submarine and enters a bonus stage (in some versions, but not for example in the ZX Spectrum version), where he can shoot various kinds of fish to score bonus points.

Releases and ports 

The game was originally released by Hewson for the ZX Spectrum, Amstrad CPC, Commodore 64, Commodore Amiga, Atari ST and Acorn Archimedes. The US version, which was published by U.S. Gold, was released under the title Tower Toppler. A version for the Atari 7800 was also released with this title.

The Game Boy and Nintendo Entertainment System versions of Castelian were developed by Bits Studios and released in the United States by Triffix and in Japan by Hiro Entertainment; in these, the lead character is called Julius. The Game Boy and Nintendo versions were later released in Japan as Kyoro Chan Land, which replaced Julius with Kyorochan, jewels with Chocoballs, altered the enemy graphics and (in the Famicom version) added a password system and a pause feature. The Italian bootleg version was called Subline. The Nintendo versions were composed by David Whittaker, and the title songs were covered by Whittaker from the original Tower Toppler game's title screen. In the Famicom version, the title screen plays what is the bonus game theme from the US version.

In 2004 it was re-released on the C64 Direct-to-TV. The C64 DTV version made comeback on the Wii's Virtual Console download service in Europe on June 13, 2008 and later in North America on May 4, 2009.

The Atari 8-bit version was being developed around 1988 by the author of the Atari 7800 port, and was intended to be released by Atari Corporation for the XE Game System. Although the game appeared in Atari promotional material of the time, it never reached the market. The game's prototype cartridge was later found.

Reception 
Compute! stated that the Commodore 64 version of Tower Toppler had "good arcade action, with well-executed graphics". Orson Scott Card wrote in the magazine that "the graphics are terrific ... As science fiction, it's fun but shallow. As an action game, it's just plain fun". Computer Gaming World gave the game a positive review. It earned a Zzap! Gold Medal Award.

The game was voted Best Original Game Of The Year at the Golden Joystick Awards. The ZX Spectrum version was rated number 30 in the Your Sinclair Official Top 100 Games of All Time. The Amiga version was ranked the 14th best game of all time by Amiga Power.

References

External links 

Tower Toppler  for the Atari 7800 at AtariAge
Castelian at GameFAQs

1987 video games
Acorn Archimedes games
Amiga games
Amstrad CPC games
Atari 7800 games
Atari ST games
Cancelled Atari 8-bit family games
Commodore 64 games
Game Boy games
Golden Joystick Award winners
GP2X games
Nintendo Entertainment System games
Palm OS games
Platform games
U.S. Gold games
Video games scored by David Whittaker
Virtual Console games
ZX Spectrum games
Single-player video games
Video games developed in the United Kingdom
Hewson Consultants games